José Luis Moreno Barroso (born 3 March 1991), commonly known as Joselu, is a Spanish footballer who plays as a forward for CD Lugo.

A youth proponent of Villarreal, where he played one La Liga season, he spent most of his professional career in Segunda División, in service of eight clubs.

Club career

Villarreal
Born in Cartaya, Province of Huelva, Joselu came through the ranks of Villarreal CF, and made his senior debut for their third team. He first appeared at the professional level on 12 June 2010, in the reserves' penultimate game of the season, as a half-time substitute in a 1–0 away loss against CD Numancia. He scored his first goal roughly one year later, opening a 2–1 defeat at Real Betis also in the Segunda División.

Joselu netted 11 times in 29 matches the following campaign, including a hat-trick on 30 September 2011 in a 3–2 home win over Gimnàstic de Tarragona. The team was eventually relegated due to the descent of their parent club, and he made 16 competitive appearances for the latter – mostly from the bench – that year, including in the UEFA Champions League. His debut was a goalless La Liga away draw to Getafe CF, replacing Jonathan de Guzmán for the final four minutes.

Later years
Joselu was loaned to Córdoba CF on 23 June 2012, ahead of the upcoming season. He remained in his native Andalusia and the second division a year later, signing a three-year deal with the option of a fourth at Recreativo de Huelva.

In January 2015, with Recre in serious financial problems halfway through a season that would end with relegation, Joselu transferred to RCD Mallorca for a year and the option of a second. He remained there only until August, when he was signed by fellow division two side CD Lugo.

On 14 June 2017, after being crowned top scorer of the second tier with 23 goals, Joselu agreed to a three-year contract with Granada CF, recently relegated from the top flight. On 13 August of the following year, he moved to Real Oviedo of the same league on a four-year deal.

Joselu joined CD Tenerife on 17 January 2020, on loan for the remainder of the season with an option to a permanent deal. This clause was activated on 2 July, but the player returned to Lugo on a one-year deal on 9 August 2021, after a goalless campaign.

On 2 January 2023, after six months without a club, Joselu returned to Lugo for a third spell, signing a contract until the end of the season.

Personal life
Joselu's younger brother, Simón, was also a footballer and a forward. He too came through Villarreal's system.

References

External links

1991 births
Living people
Sportspeople from the Province of Huelva
Spanish footballers
Footballers from Andalusia
Association football forwards
La Liga players
Segunda División players
Tercera División players
Villarreal CF C players
Villarreal CF B players
Villarreal CF players
Córdoba CF players
Recreativo de Huelva players
RCD Mallorca players
CD Lugo players
Granada CF footballers
Real Oviedo players
CD Tenerife players